Latha Rajinikanth (born Latha Rangachari; 2 March 1958) is an Indian film producer and playback singer. She is the wife of actor Rajinikanth.

Early life
Latha was born in Chennai, India in a Tamil Brahmin Iyengar family. She graduated with degree in English literature from Ethiraj College for Women, Chennai.

Career
During the 1980s, Latha worked as a playback singer in Tamil cinema. She sung a few songs in films such as Tik Tik Tik (1981) Anbulla Rajinikanth (1984). She also contributed to Rajini 25 (1999), a musical album that commemorated Rajinikanth's 25 years of his career.

In 1991, Latha founded The Ashram, a school in Velachery, Chennai, which she currently heads.

Personal life
Latha is the sister-in-law of Tamil playwright and film actor Y Gee Mahendran. She is also related to former film actress Vyjayanthimala. Latha's brother Ravi Raghavendra is also an actor who is the father of music director Anirudh Ravichander. She married Rajinikanth, whom she met during an exclusive interview, on 26 February 1981 at Tirupati. The couple has two daughters, Aishwarya and Soundarya. Her elder daughter, Aishwarya married actor Dhanush in 2004 and they have two sons, Yathra and Linga. Her younger daughter Soundarya married Chennai based civil engineer Ashwin with whom she has a son named Ved Krishna; the couple divorced in 2017 and she remarried businessman Vishagan in 2019.

Controversy

Document forgery case 
An FIR had been filed in Bangalore against Latha for allegedly forging documents to obtain a court order, restraining media from publishing news about her dispute with a commissioned producer over selling of rights of Kochadaiiyan on 15 June 2015.

Rent issues 
Latha operates a shop on CP Ramaswamy Road. Operating from a building owned by Chennai Corporation, Latha has for the past 25 years run a travel agency called "Travel Exchange India". The city Corporation recently increased the rent from ₹ 3702 to ₹ 21,160 per month. Latha filed a petition in the Madras High Court challenging the decision of the Greater Chennai Corporation. The Madras HC dismissed the petition filed on Latha Rajinikanth's behalf and ordered the corporation to take ownership of the property in a month if the due rental was not received.

A school run by Latha Rajinikanth in Chennai was locked up by the landlord of the building in August 2017, who claimed he had not received two rent of ₹ 2 crore. The owner said in 2002 he leased out the school ground to be used. He said that over a year ago he had filed a case against the management of the school because they had not paid the rent amounting to ₹ 10 crore. In December 2020, the Madras High Court has ordered Latha to vacate the school by 30 April.

Filmography

As producer

As singer
 "Netru Indha Neram" - Tik Tik Tik
 "Kadavul Ullame" - Anbulla Rajinikanth
 "Ding Dong" - Valli
 "Kukkukoo Koovum" - Valli
 "Manappenin Sathiyam" - Kochadaiiyaan

As costume designer
 Valli (1993)

References

Indian women film producers
Film producers from Chennai
Living people
Singers from Chennai
Tamil film producers
Tamil playback singers
Indian women playback singers
20th-century Indian singers
Founders of Indian schools and colleges
Indian women philanthropists
Indian philanthropists
20th-century Indian women singers
21st-century Indian women singers
21st-century Indian singers
Women musicians from Tamil Nadu
Businesswomen from Tamil Nadu
20th-century Indian businesswomen
20th-century Indian businesspeople
1958 births